Robert or Bob Snyder may refer to:

Bob Snyder (American football) (1913–2001), American football player and coach
Bob Snyder (musician), American musician
Bob Snyder (artist) (born 1946), American composer, sound and video artist
Robert Snyder (filmmaker) (1916–2004), documentary filmmaker
Robert C. Snyder (1919–2011), professor of English at Louisiana Tech University
Robert H. Snyder (1855–1906), Democratic politician
Robert Michael Snyder (born 1954), American author and US Chess Master
Robert Snyder (civil servant), American soldier and Acting Secretary of Veteran Affairs
Robert J. Snyder, attorney in the United States Supreme Court case In re Snyder